Charles Fleetford Sise Jr. was a Canadian businessman and president of Bell Canada from March 25, 1925, to November 1, 1944.

He graduated from McGill University in 1897 with a degree in Electrical and Mechanical Engineering.

See also
 Charles Fleetford Sise (father)
 Edward Fleetford Sise (brother)
 Paul Fleetford Sise (brother)
 Thomas Wardrope Eadie

References

Canadian businesspeople
People of Bell Canada
McGill University Faculty of Engineering alumni
Canadian electrical engineers
Canadian mechanical engineers
Corporate executives
Year of birth missing
Year of death missing